Inner Workings is a 3D hand-drawn and computer-animated adventure short film produced by Walt Disney Animation Studios. It is written and directed by Leo Matsuda and produced by Sean Lurie. It premiered in theaters on November 23, 2016 along with Walt Disney Pictures' Moana.

Plot
The short follows the inner workings of Paul, a man living in California during the 1980s. Paul's Brain, Heart, Lungs, Stomach and even his Bladder and Kidneys all awaken on a typical day for work. Heart expresses desires to try a large breakfast special at the urging of Stomach, play around on the beach, and try out a new pair of sunglasses at a stand that is run by an attractive sunglass vendor named Kate. However, Brain simply wants Paul to get to work on time at Boring, Boring & Glum and avoid possible hazards that Brain thinks will kill Paul along the way. Fed up with Heart's constant sidetracked nature, Brain takes away Heart's control so that Paul can get to work on time. He and dozens of other employees sit at desks and enter data into their computers, moving simultaneously. Brain takes notice of the dreary routine of Paul's life and comes to realize that this cycle will eventually lead to his death as a depressed, miserable, and lonely man.

During lunchtime, Brain gives control of Paul back to Heart, who sends him off to partake of the activities that Brain had passed up on the way to the office. Paul returns to work afterward, happy and content, and begins to dance to a lively beat whose energy quickly spreads to his coworkers and even to his elderly bosses. During the credits, Paul starts performing other fun activities with his bosses and coworkers, marries Kate, and has children with her.

Cast
Tucker Gilmore
Raymond S. Persi
Terri Douglas
The Loop Troop

Production

In April 2016, it was announced that Walt Disney Animation Studios had developed another short film, titled Inner Workings, about the internal struggle between a man's pragmatic, logical side and his free-spirited, adventurous half. Leo Matsuda, a story artist on Big Hero 6 and Wreck-It Ralph, directed the film, which Sean Lurie produced. According to Matsuda, the film was loosely based on biological transparent overlays he read from Encyclopædia Britannica as a child.

The short combines hand-drawn and CG animation, using Walt Disney Animation Studios' 2D interpolation software Meander, which was employed before in their Oscar-winning shorts Paperman and Feast.

Music
The short's music was composed by Ludwig Göransson. The Miami Sound Machine-esque theme song "California Loco", featuring Este Haim, was released on Amazon.com on December 16, 2016.

Release
Inner Workings was released on November 23, 2016, along with Walt Disney Pictures' Moana  and also included in The Animation Showcase 2016.

See also
Inside Out (2015)
Reason and Emotion (1943)
Osmosis Jones (2001)
Cranium Command (theme park attraction)
Cranium (board game)

References

External links

2016 short films
2016 computer-animated films
American animated short films
American animated comedy films
Animated adventure films
Human body
American adventure comedy films
2010s Disney animated short films
Films scored by Ludwig Göransson
Films set in the 1980s
Animated films set in California
2016 animated films
Animated films without speech
American comedy short films